Eastcote is an area in the London Borough of Hillingdon.

Eastcote may also refer to the following places in England:

 Eastcote tube station
 Eastcote, Northamptonshire
 Eastcote, West Midlands, an area in Solihull

See also 
 Ascot (disambiguation)
 Eastcott (disambiguation)